A grain is a unit of measurement of mass, and in the troy weight, avoirdupois, and apothecaries' systems, equal to exactly  milligrams. It is nominally based upon the mass of a single ideal seed of a cereal. From the Bronze Age into the Renaissance, the average masses of wheat and barley grains were part of the legal definitions of units of mass. Expressions such as "thirty-two grains of wheat, taken from the middle of the ear" appear to have been ritualistic formulas, essentially the premodern equivalent of legal boilerplate. Another book states that Captain Henry Kater, of the British Standards Commission, arrived at this value experimentally.

The grain was the legal foundation of traditional English weight systems, and is the only unit that is equal throughout the troy, avoirdupois, and apothecaries' systems of mass. The unit was based on the weight of a single grain of barley, considered equivalent to  grains of wheat. The fundamental unit of the pre-1527 English weight system known as Tower weights, was a different sort of grain known as the "wheat grain". The Tower wheat grain was defined as exactly .

Since the implementation of the international yard and pound agreement of 1 July 1959, the grain or troy grain (symbol: gr) measure has been defined in terms of units of mass in the International System of Units as precisely .

In both British Imperial units and United States customary units, there are precisely 7,000 grains per avoirdupois pound, and 5,760 grains per troy pound or apothecaries' pound. It is obsolete in the United Kingdom and, like most other non-SI units, it has no basis in law and cannot be used in commerce.

Current usage 

Grains are commonly used to measure the mass of bullets and propellants. In archery, the grain is the standard unit used to weigh arrows.

In North America, the hardness of water is often measured in grains per US gallon (gpg) of calcium carbonate equivalents. Otherwise, water hardness is measured in the dimensionless unit of parts per million (ppm), numerically equivalent to density measured in milligrams per litre. Soft water contains 1–4 gpg of calcium carbonate equivalents, while hard water contains 11–20 gpg.

Though no longer recommended, in the U.S., grains are still used occasionally in medicine as part of the apothecaries' system, especially in prescriptions for older medicines such as aspirin or phenobarbital. The apothecaries' system has its own system of notation, in which the unit's symbol or abbreviation is followed by the quantity in lower case Roman numerals. For amounts less than one, the quantity is written as a fraction, or for one half, ss (or variations such as ss., ṡṡ, or s̅s̅). Therefore, a prescription for tablets containing 325 mg of aspirin and 30 mg of codeine can be written "ASA gr. v c̄ cod. gr. ss tablets" (using the medical abbreviations ASA for aspirin, c̄ for "with", and cod. for codeine). The apothecaries' system has gradually been replaced by the metric system, and the use of the grain in prescriptions is now rare.

In the U.S., particulate emission levels, used to monitor and regulate pollution, are sometimes measured in grains per cubic foot instead of the more usual ppm by volume. This is the same unit commonly used to measure the amount of moisture in the air, also known as the absolute humidity. The SI unit used to measure particulate emissions and absolute humidity is mg/m.

History 

At least since antiquity, grains of wheat or barley were used by Mediterranean traders to define units of mass; along with other seeds, especially those of the carob tree. According to a longstanding tradition, one carat (the mass of a carob seed) was equivalent to the weight of four wheat grains or three barleycorns. Since the weights of these seeds are highly variable, especially that of the cereals as a function of moisture, this is a convention more than an absolute law.

The history of the modern British grain can be traced back to a royal decree in thirteenth century England, re-iterating decrees that go back as far as King Offa (eighth century). The Tower pound was one of many monetary pounds of 240 silver pennies.

The pound in question is the Tower pound. The weight of the original sterling pennies was 22½ troy grains, or 32 "Tower grains".

Physical grain weights were made and sold commercially at least as late as the early 1900s, and took various forms, from squares of sheet metal to manufactured wire shapes and coin-like weights.

The troy pound was only "the pound of Pence, Spices, Confections, as of Electuaries", as such goods might be measured by a troi or small balance. The old troy standard was set by King Offa's currency reform, and was in full use in 1284 (Assize of Weights and Measures, King Edward I), but was restricted to currency (the pound of pennies) until it was abolished in 1527. This pound was progressively replaced by a new pound, based on the weight of 120 silver dirhems of 48 grains. The new pound used a barley-corn grain, rather than a wheat grain.

Avoirdupois (goods of weight) refers to those things measured by the lesser but quicker balances: the bismar or auncel, the Roman balance, and the steelyard. The original mercantile pound of 25 shillings or 15 (Tower) ounces was displaced by, variously, the pound of the Hanseatic League (16 tower ounces) and by the pound of the then-important wool trade (16 ounces of 437 grains). A new pound of  grains was inadvertently created as 16 troy ounces, referring to the new troy rather than the old troy. Eventually, the wool pound won out.

In the Imperial Weights and Measures Act of 1824, the avoirdupois pound was defined as  grains exactly. The act of 1855 authorised Miller's new standards to replace those lost in the fire that destroyed the Houses of Parliament.

The division of the carat into four grains survives in both senses well into the early twentieth century. For pearls and diamonds, weight is quoted in carats, divided into four grains. The carat was eventually set to 205 milligrams (1877), and later 200 milligrams. For touch or fineness of gold, the fraction of gold was given as a weight, the total being a solidus of 24 carats or 96 grains.

See also 
 English unit

Notes 
1.The exact value of one grain per US gallon is  mg/L (ppm).
2.The exact value of one grain per cubic foot is  mg/m3.

References 

Units of mass
Imperial units
Customary units of measurement in the United States
Ammunition